Todey and Tangta are two small villages in the Gorubathan CD block in the Kalimpong Sadar subdivision of the Kalimpong district in West Bengal, India.

Geography

Location

Area overview
The map alongside shows the Kalimpong Sadar subdivision of Kalimpong district. This region is characterized by abruptly rising hills and numerous small streams. It is a predominantly rural area with 77.67% of the population living in rural areas and only 22.23% living in the urban areas. While Kalimpong is the only municipality, Dungra is the sole census town in the entire area. The economy is agro-based and there are 6 tea gardens in the Gorubathan CD block. In 2011, Kalimpong subdivision had a literacy rate of 81.85%, comparable with the highest levels of literacy in the districts of the state. While the first degree college in the subdivision was established at Kalimpong in 1962the entire subdivision (and now the entire district), other than the head-quarters, had to wait till as late as 2015 (more than half a century) to have their first degree colleges at Pedong and Gorubathan.
Todey Tangta is a Kashmahal wherein there are lots of villages that depend on the main market known as Todey Bazaar.

Note: The map alongside presents some of the notable locations in the subdivision. All places marked in the map are linked in the larger full screen map.

Demographics
According to the 2011 Census of India, Tody Tangta Khasmahal had a total population of 5,290 of which 2,721 (51%) were males and 2,569 (49%) were females. There were 624 persons in the age range of 0 to 6 years. The total number of literate people in Todey Tangta Khasmahal was 3,445 (73.83% of the population over 6 years).

Economy
The area is famous for Black cardamom production. Tourism infrastructure is just getting developed here and there are limited tourist accommodations available. Some Homestays are available there- Cardamom Homestay Pala and Hangleena Hotel. There is a monastery at Todey. The area is also known for medicinal plants. People use horses as a medium of transportation.

References

Villages in Kalimpong district